Lenhydroproject is a major research and design institute for hydrotechnology and hydroelectric engineering based in St. Petersburg, Russia. Since 1993 it is incorporated as a "JSC Lenhydroproject", part of RusHydro company.

The institute traces its history to the "Northern Russia hydro resources investigation team" established in April 1917 for research of rivers for the Ministry of Railroads.

Projects

Power stations
Sayano–Shushenskaya hydroelectric power station
Krasnoyarsk hydroelectric power station
Narva Hydroelectric Station
Zeya Hydroelectric Station
Votkinsk Hydroelectric Station (Votkinsk Reservoir)
Chirkey Hydroelectric Station
Ust-Srednekan Hydroelectric Plant

Dams of height over 100m
Sayano-Shushensk Dam (242 m) 
Chirkey Dam (232 m)
Bureya Dam (140 m) 
Kolyma Dam (126 m) 
Krasnoyarsk Dam (124 m)
Zeya Dam (115 m)
Irganai Dam (101 m)

References

External links
 

Hydroelectricity in Russia
Engineering companies of Russia
Electric power companies of Russia
Companies based in Saint Petersburg
Companies of the Soviet Union
RusHydro
Energy companies established in 1917
Construction and civil engineering companies established in 1917
1917 establishments in Russia